John Hauser may refer to:
 John Hauser (painter) (1859–1913), American painter
 John R. Hauser, professor of marketing
 John A. Hauser (1907–1983), American businessman and philanthropist

See also
 John Houser (disambiguation)